The platinum blonde is an infused cocktail made from vodka, citrus and herbal liqueur. The cocktail has a citrus–herbal flavor profile, and is often flavored with rosemary and elderflower. It is similar to the classic cloister cocktail, which calls for gin and chartreuse.

See also
 List of cocktails

References 

Cocktails with vodka
Cocktails with grapefruit juice
Cocktails with lemon juice
Citrus cocktails